Goblins in the Castle is a children's fantasy novel by American author Bruce Coville, first published in 1992 with illustrations by Katherine Coville. A sequel, Goblins on the Prowl, was published in June 2015.

Plot summary
William has quite happily lived all his life in Toad-in-a-Cage castle with its endless rooms, dark winding stairways, and disturbing noises. Then one night he discovers those noises come from the dungeon, where a hunchback named Igor and his stuffed teddy bear guard a mysterious door. William unintentionally opens the door, freeing a horde of imprisoned goblins back into the unsuspecting world. He and Igor set out to round them up and have many adventures.

Illustrations
The book has 10 black and white drawings by Katherine Coville with cover art by Tim Hildebrandt.

References

1992 American novels
American fantasy novels
American children's novels
Children's fantasy novels
Fictional goblins
1992 children's books
Novels by Bruce Coville